Haplochromis nigroides is a species of cichlid endemic to Lake Kivu on the border of the Democratic Republic of the Congo and Rwanda.  This species can reach a length of  SL.

References

nigroides
Fish described in 1928
Taxonomy articles created by Polbot